Ramgopalpet Police Station, also known as the James Street Police Station is located on the MG Road, Secunderabad (earlier known as James Street) in Secunderabad.

It falls under the central zone of the Hyderabad City Police. The Hussain Sagar lake police also comes under the jurisdiction of this police station.

History
The clock was donated in 1900 to the then James Street Police Station by Dewan Bahadur Seth Ramgopal. The Ramgopalpet Police Station building was designated as a heritage building by Andhra Pradesh government order dated 23 March 1998. In 2016 municipal authorities asked all personnel working in the structure to vacate after the building was deemed unsafe and scheduled for demolition.

References 

Police stations in India
Heritage structures in Hyderabad, India